"Face Off" is the 13th episode and mid-season premiere of the supernatural drama television series Grimm of season 2 and the 35th overall, which premiered on March 8, 2013, on NBC. The episode was written by series creators Jim Kouf and David Greenwalt, and was directed by Terrence O'Hara.

Plot
Opening quote: "The will to conquer is the first condition of victory."

Nick (David Giuntoli) has just found that Juliette (Bitsie Tulloch) and Renard (Sasha Roiz) were kissing in the spice shop. He is then called to investigate the deaths of the Hundjägers he and Monroe (Silas Weir Mitchell) killed.

Renard enters the trailer to find the key, but he can't find it. In the station, they find footage of the hotel where Monroe (face unseen) is followed by the Hundjägers. Monroe calls Rosalee (Bree Turner) so they can work on a cure for Juliette and Renard. Renard visits Juliette and they continue kissing, something Nick is watching from distance. He gets out of the car, planning on confronting them but receives a call from Monroe, who claims that Rosalee can find a way to cure them. In the house, they begin agreeing or disagreeing about having sex, so Juliette takes Renard's gun and begins shooting in the house so he is forced to leave.

Adalind (Claire Coffee) is freed from the jail but is forced by Renard to come with him to a lake. He tells her to "fix" him but she states that although she can't, she can make it "better" and they have sex. In the station, Renard finally finds the key in Nick's desk and takes it. In the spice shop, Monroe finally deduces that Renard is the boss, or called "Royal" in Portland for the purification spell and that they need Juliette and Renard to take it. However, another ingredient required is Adalind's cat and as it died, Nick will be forced to drink the antidote.

Renard lies to Adalind that he didn't find the key and calls Nick to meet in a specific place. They meet at the Postman's house where Nick attacks Renard and he finally finds out that he is a Wesen. Renard explains that he came to give him the key and he knew Nick was a Grimm even before Nick and he is on his side. In the spice shop, Nick takes the antidote and passes through the same pain process Renard went through. In Vienna, Adalind has a pregnancy test and smiles when it shows positive.

Reception

Viewers
The episode was viewed by 4.90 million people, earning a 1.5/5 in the 18-49 rating demographics on the Nielson ratings scale, ranking second on its timeslot and third for the night in the 18-49 demographics, behind Last Man Standing, 20/20, and Shark Tank. This was a 3% decrease in viewership from the previous episode, which was watched by 5.03 million viewers with a 1.6/5. This means that 1.5 percent of all households with televisions watched the episode, while 5 percent of all households watching television at that time watched it. With DVR factoring in, the episode was watched by 7.71 million viewers with a 2.7 ratings share in the 18-49 demographics.

Critical reviews
"Face Off" received positive reviews. The A.V. Club's Kevin McFarland gave the episode a "B+" grade and wrote, "Grimm has shown that when the serialized pieces click into place, it becomes far more compelling. The best case-of-the-week episodes — last season's 'Organ Grinder,' last Halloween's 'La Llorona' — are good examples of how to keep the wheels spinning without losing interest. But the little tidbits of information that expand the Wesen world—the conflict between the rebels, the Verrat, the royals, and the Grimms they traditionally employ — is the most fascinating and important part of a supernatural/fantasy show like this. It's taken quite a while for the mythology and characterization to catch up, but as the characters have been filled in and a clearer picture of what's going on in this world is revealed, Grimm has improved more often than it has stumbled."

Nick McHatton from TV Fanatic, gave a 4.0 star rating out of 5, stating: "'Face Off' was really a culmination of payoffs all of us have been waiting over a year for. Juliette and Renard's actions are beginning to make some sense, Adalind continues to be a great villain, and, most importantly, Nick and Renard finally tip their hands to each other."

Shilo Adams from TV Overmind, wrote: "After hearing that his (ex-?)almost-fiancee had been cheating on him with his boss, Nick is ready to get violent on somebody, preferably Renard. Monroe intervenes before anything could happen, delaying his friend long enough that a call comes in about a quadruple homicide – the quadruple homicide that Nick committed in the fall finale. The four dead bodies – all Verrat, three of them men – were never disposed of nor were they hidden, although taking their ids and doing the act in an area not beholden to surveillance cameras keeps Nick's secret under wraps. For now."

Josie Campbell from TV.com wrote, "But what really made 'Face Off' great was that it got right back to the fast-paced info-dump from the beginning of Season 2. Secrets were revealed in a way that felt satisfying and also gave rise to more questions; characters were thinking as fast as they were reacting, crashing headfirst into the changing status quo. Though I'd be happier if Monroe and Nick had more gradually pieced together the Hexenbiest/Juliette's Memory Loss puzzle over a few episodes instead of figuring it out all at once, once things started to dawn on them, a lot of fun was had."

References

External links
 

Grimm (season 2) episodes
2013 American television episodes
Television episodes written by David Greenwalt